Sena Kalyan Sangstha is a trust owned and operated by Bangladesh Army. It owns a number of businesses including travel agency, electronics and cement factory and ice cream. Major General Iftekhar Anis, BSP, awc, afwc, psc, PEng is the chairman of Sena Kalyan Sangstha.

History
The organization started in 1953 when Bangladesh was a part of Pakistan as the Fauji Foundation. After the independence of Bangladesh it was renamed to Sena Kalyan Sangstha in 1972. It is headquartered in Dhaka in a 23-storey building, Sena Kalyan Bhaban. It started a rice mill and a flower mill during the Pakistan Era. It also owns companies that include savoy Ice cream, Energy Savings Lamp, Habib fan, Citizen Fridge, Elephant cement, television and transformer factory.

In 2016, the trust signed a MOU with Bawani group of Saudi Arabia to export Manpower. In 2013, the trust was appointed to 3 billion taka convention center in Chittagong city. In 2015, the trust launched Sena Kalyan Travels and Tours, a travel agency. The trust also owns a Liquefied petroleum gas plant.

In 2015, 7 workers were killed and 50 injured while constructing a warehouse for the trust in Mongla. The Trust build Mongla cement plant with a loan from Pakistan that was secured in 1988. Sena Hotel Developments Limited which operates Radisson Blu in Bangladesh is owned by Sena Kalyan Sangstha and Bangladesh Army Welfare Trust.

On 29 August 2021, Bank Asia donated 5 million taka to Sena Kalyan Sangstha. The trust owns KB Petrochemicals Limited jointly with a Middle Eastern company and recently signed an agreement with Eastern Lubricants Blenders Limited, a state owned company.

Subsidiaries 
 Sena Kalyan Constructions & Developments (SKCD)
 Mongla Cement Factory, Bagerhat
 Fauji Flour Mill, Chittagong
 Diamond Food Industries, Chittagong
 Chittagong Flour Mill, Chittagong
 Sena Kalyan Electric Industries, Chittagong
Sena Kalyan Electronics
 Sena Kalyan Ready Mix Concrete, Mirpur, Dhaka
 Eastern Hosiery Mills, Tongi, Gazipur
 Sena tent and Textile Mills (formerly Enesel Textile Mills), Chittagong
 Sena Kalyan Edible Oil Industries
 Sena Kalyan LPG Bottling Plant
Sena Filling and CNG Station
Sena Kalyan Insurance Company Limited
SKS Trading House
Sena Kalyan Bhaban, Motijheel
Amin Mohiuddin Foundation building
Sena Commercial Complex, Dhaka-Tongi Road.
Anannya Shopping Complex, Baridhara DOHS
Sena Kalyan Sangstha Tower, Mohakhali
Sena Kalyan Business Mart, Tejgaon
Sena Kalyan Trade Center, Agrabad, Chittagong
SKS Convention Hall
Sena Kalyan Travels and Tours
Sena Kalyan Overseas Employment Services Limited
Savoy Ice Cream Factory Ltd

See also 

 Bangladesh Army Welfare Trust
 Bangladesh Army
 Sena Paribar Kalyan Samity

References

Military of Bangladesh
Government agencies of Bangladesh
Government agencies established in 1953
1953 establishments in East Pakistan